Jacob Eisenberg (1897–1965) (also Yaakov Eisenberg)  was an Israeli artist and a member of the Bezalel school.

Eisenberg was born in Pinsk and immigrated to the land of Israel in 1913.  He studied art at the School for Arts and Crafts in Vienna, specializing in ceramics and at the Bezalel Academy of Art and Design in Jerusalem, where he continued as a teacher for many years.

Particularly notable was his creation of a series of ceramic plaques and murals for the early buildings of Tel Aviv.  These included the cities first street signs, ceramic plaques in deep blue inscribed with the street names in Hebrew, Arabic and English that were affixed to the corners of buildings.  The surviving plaques are now treasured historic landmarks.  Large Eisenberg murals enliven the facades of several Tel Aviv buildings, including the 1925 Lederberg house, at the intersection of Rothschild Boulevard and Allenby Street.  The four murals show a Jewish pioneer sowing and harvesting, a shepherd, and Jerusalem with a verse from Jeremiah 31:4, "Again I will rebuild thee and thous shalt be rebuilt."

Works
 Stained Glass, Great Synagogue, Tel Aviv
 Ceramics and stained glass, Y.M.C.A., Jerusalem

Exhibitions
 Jerusalem Artists' House, 1957

References

Bezalel Academy of Arts and Design alumni
Jews from the Russian Empire
Emigrants from the Russian Empire to the Ottoman Empire
Israeli people of Belarusian-Jewish descent
Belarusian Jews
Jewish artists
People from Pinsky Uyezd
People from Pinsk
1897 births
1965 deaths
Date of birth missing
Date of death missing
Place of death missing
Painters of the Holy Land pre-1948
20th-century Israeli artists